Starke County Airport  is a public airport  northwest of Knox, in Starke County, Indiana. The airport was founded in April 1977.

The airport is home to iFLY Indiana Powered Paragliding.  A United States Powered Paragliding Association (USPPA) approved Paramotor school.  iFLY Indiana Powered Paragliding was founded in 2018 and is a full service school providing instruction, gear and service to the Powered Paragliding community. 

The training field is one of the best in country as the property is surrounded by open farmland and very few obstacles.

References

External links 
 http://www.airnav.com/airport/KOXI
 http://www.starkecountyairport.com/index.html
http://www.iflyindiana.com

Airports in Indiana
Transportation buildings and structures in Starke County, Indiana